Phaser Patrol, written by Dennis Caswell, is the first numbered release by Arcadia for the Atari 2600 and was the pack-in game for the Atari 2600 Supercharger accessory in 1982. The company changed its name to Starpath after launch, and the hardware was rebranded the Starpath Supercharger.  The game simulates space combat in which the player pilots a ship to destroy the Dracon invaders.

Reception
BYTE stated of Phaser Patrol that "the hyperdrive simulation is very addictive ... Scoring well in this game is a combination of skill and strategy", Danny Goodman of Creative Computing Video & Arcade Games praised the high resolution of the game's instrument panel as an example of the Supercharger's excellent graphics.

The game was a runner-up in the category of "Best Video Game Audiovisual Effects" at the 4th annual Arkie Awards.

References

External links
Phaser Patrol at Atari Mania

1982 video games
Atari 2600 games
Atari 2600-only games
North America-exclusive video games
Pack-in video games
Space combat simulators
Starpath games
Video games developed in the United States